"Butta Bomma" is an Indian Telugu-language song by singer Armaan Malik and composed by S. Thaman from the 2020 soundtrack album Ala Vaikunthapurramuloo of the film of the same name. The lyrics are written by Ramajogayya Sastry. The song's lyrical version was released on 23 December 2019, while the full video song was released on 21 February 2020 under the music label Aditya Music. The single is filmed at Annapurna Studios.

Release 
The teaser of the song was scheduled to release on 18 December 2019, but due to technical difficulties, it was released on 22 December. The full video was released on 21 February 2020.

Music video 
The music video features Allu Arjun and Pooja Hegde dancing for the single. The music is choreographed by Jani Master, a well-known choreographer from Tollywood. The full video song was officially released on 21 February 2020 by the Aditya Music label.

In July 2020, the producers released a statement saying that "Butta Bomma" was the most-viewed Telugu song on YouTube of all time, and in November 2021, they released a tweet stating that it had had over 700 million views.

Reception

Audience response 
Upon the release of the full video version of the song, its music and the choreography by Jani Master, as well as the performance by singer Armaan Malik received positive reviews.  

The song became a viral hit across the Indian subcontinent and other parts of the world. Allu Arjun's rolling step in the music video featured in short videos created by fans and uploaded to TikTok, ShareChat, and other social media platforms. Several Indian actors and singers uploaded videos where they recreated the step, as did Australian cricketer David Warner and South African-British cricketer Kevin Pietersen.

Reviews 
123Telugu on reviewing the music of the soundtrack called it "an instant charmer",  and a reviewer for IndiaGlitz.com praised its lyrics.

Other versions 
The song was later released as a single in Malayalam as "Kutti Bomma" on 6 January 2020, for the film's Malayalam version, with lyrics written by B. K. Harinarayanan, and Srikrishna Vishnubhotla singing the song. On 16 November 2020, a Kannada version of the song with lyrics by V. Manohar was released as "Putta Bombe", sung by Deepak Subrahmanyam. A reprise version featuring Anudeep Dev was released on 25 June 2020. Benny Dayal sang the Hindi version with lyrics written by Rajesh Manthan.

Live performances 
Armaan Malik and S. Thaman performed "Butta Bomma" live together for the first time at a special music concert for the film's promotion. It was held on 6 January 2020, at Yousufguda Police Grounds in Hyderabad. On 19 January 2020, singer Raghu Ram and S. Thaman performed "Butta Bomma" live together at the film's success meet held at Visakhapatnam. In March 2020, Armaan Malik performed the song at the Nitte Meenakshi Institute of Technology's college fest Anaadyanta.

Accolades

References

External links

2020 songs
Songs from Ala Vaikunthapurramuloo
Songs with music by S. Thaman